Ananda Rao or Anandarao is an Indian name based on the Buddha's principle disciple Ānanda.

 Ananda Rao Samuel (1928–1999), bishop of Krishna Godavari of the Church of South India
 B. Radhabai Ananda Rao (born 1930), member of Indian Parliament
 T. Ananda Rao, (1852–1919), Indian administrator and Diwan of Mysore